The 2014 season was Minnesota United FC's fifth season of existence and their fourth consecutive season playing in the North American Soccer League, the second division of the American soccer pyramid.

Roster

Staff

  Nick Rogers – President
  Manny Lagos – Technical Director and Head Coach
  Carl Craig – Assistant Coach
  Paul O'Connor – Goalkeeping Coach
  Donny Mark – Reserve Team Coach
  Craig Mallace – Director of Camps & Youth Development
  Dr. Corey Wulf – Team Doctor
  Dr. Brad Moser – Team Doctor
  Yoshiyuki Ono – Team Trainer

Transfers 
Note: Flags indicate national team as has been defined under FIFA eligibility rules. Players may hold more than one non-FIFA nationality.

In:

Out:

Friendlies

Competitions

NASL Spring Championship

Results summary

Results by round

Matches

NASL Fall Championship

Results summary

Results by round

Matches

NASL Playoffs

Semi-finals

US Open Cup

Squad statistics

Appearances and goals

|-
|colspan="14"|Players who left Minnesota United during the season:

|-
|}

Goal scorers

Disciplinary record

See also 
 Minnesota United FC
 2014 North American Soccer League season
 2014 in American soccer

References 

Minnesota United FC seasons
Minnesota United Football Club
Minnesota United